Simona Halep was the defending champion, but lost in the quarterfinals to Serena Williams.

Victoria Azarenka won the title, defeating World No. 1 Williams in the final, 6–4, 6–4.

This edition of the tournament marked Venus Williams' return to Indian Wells for the first time since 2001.

Seeds
All seeds received a bye into the second round.

Draw

Finals

Top half

Section 1

Section 2

Section 3

Section 4

Bottom half

Section 5

Section 6

Section 7

Section 8

Qualifying

Seeds

Qualifiers

Lucky losers
  Anna-Lena Friedsam

Qualifying draw

First qualifier

Second qualifier

Third qualifier

Fourth qualifier

Fifth qualifier

Sixth qualifier

Seventh qualifier

Eighth qualifier

Ninth qualifier

Tenth qualifier

Eleventh qualifier

Twelfth qualifier

References

External links
 Main draw
 Qualifying draw

Women's Singles